The Battle of Leyte Gulf, generally considered to be the largest naval combat in history, was fought 24–25 October 1944 in the waters of the Philippine Islands by elements of the Imperial Japanese Navy's Combined Fleet (bringing together the IJN's 2nd Fleet, 3rd Fleet and 5th Fleet) and the United States Navy's Pacific Fleet (bringing together the USN's 3rd Fleet and 7th Fleet). Of the five separate engagements that made up the battle as a whole, the forces involved in the three principal ones are listed here. 

Since the Japanese assumed the tactical initiative in all three actions, their forces are listed first in each section.

Losses in these three actions
IJN: 1 fleet carrier, 3 light carriers, 2 old battleships, 3 heavy cruisers, 3 light cruisers, 9 destroyers, 1 oiler
USN: 2 escort carriers, 2 destroyers, 1 destroyer escort 
 The light aircraft carrier  was heavily damaged and scuttled with great loss of life on 24 October while engaging in battle against land-based Japanese aircraft flying into the Leyte area east of Luzon. The loss of Princeton is always included in the casualties of the Battle of Leyte Gulf.

24–25 Oct – Battle of Surigao Strait 

(according to )

Japanese Forces 
Southern Force
Vice Admiral Shōji Nishimura (killed during battle) in battleship Yamashiro

 Force C (sortied from Brunei Bay 22 Oct)
 Vice Adm. Nishimura (KIA)
 Battleship Division 2 (Vice Adm. Nishimura – KIA)
 2 old battleships
 Fusō (12 × 14-in. main battery) 
 Yamashiro (12 × 14-in. main battery) 
 1 heavy cruiser
 Mogami (6 × 8-in. main battery) 
 Destroyer Division 4 (Capt. K. Takahashi)
 3 Asashio-class destroyers (6 × 5-in. main battery)
 Michishio , Yamagumo , Asagumo 
 1 Shiratsuyu-class destroyer (5 × 5-in. main battery)
 Shigure

 Second Striking Force (sortied from Pescadores, Formosa 22 Oct)
 Vice Admiral Kiyohide Shima in heavy cruiser Nachi
 Cruiser Division 21 (Vice Admiral Shima)
 2 heavy cruisers
 Nachi (10 × 8-in. main battery)
 Ashigara (10 × 8-in. main battery)
 Destroyer Squadron 1 (Rear Adm. Masatomi Kimura)
 1 light cruiser
 Abukuma (7 × 5.5-in. main battery) 
 4 destroyers
 2 Fubuki-class (6 × 5-in. main battery)
 Akebono, Ushio 
 1 Asashio-class (6 × 5-in. main battery)
 Kasumi
 1 Kagero-class (6 × 5-in. main battery)
 Shiranui

American Forces 

Seventh Fleet
Vice Admiral Thomas C. Kinkaid in amphibious command ship Wasatch

 Task Force 77 (Central Philippines Attack Force)
 Vice Admiral Kinkaid

 Task Group 77.2 
 Rear Admiral Jesse B. Oldendorf in heavy cruiser Louisville

 Task Unit 77.2.2 (Left Flank)
 Rear Admiral Jesse B. Oldendorf
 3 heavy cruisers
 1 Northampton-class (9 x 8in. main battery)
 Louisville (Capt. S.H. Hurt)
 1 Portland-class (9 × 8-in. main battery)
 Portland (Capt. Thomas G. W. Settle)
 1 New Orleans-class (9 × 8-in. main battery)
 Minneapolis (Capt. H.B. Slocum)
 2 light cruisers
 Both Cleveland-class (12 × 6-in. main battery)
 Denver (Capt. A.M. Bledsoe)
 Columbia (Capt. Maurice E. Curts)
 Destroyer Squadron 56 (Capt. Roland N. Smoot)
 9 Fletcher-class destroyers (5 × 5-in. main battery)
 Newcomb, Richard P. Leary, Albert W. Grant , Robinson, Halford, Bryant, Heywood L. Edwards, Bennion, Leutze

 Task Unit 77.2.1 (Battle Line)
 Rear Admiral George L. Weyler in battleship Mississippi
 6 old battleships
 2 Colorado-class (8 × 16-in. main battery)
 West Virginia (Capt. Herbert V. Wiley)
 Maryland (Capt. Herbert J. Ray)
 2 Tennessee-class (12 × 14-in. main battery)
 Tennessee (Capt. J.B. Heffernan)
 California (Capt. H.P. Burnett)
 1 New Mexico-class (12 × 14-in. main battery)
 Mississippi (Capt. H.J. Redfield)
 1 Pennsylvania-class (12 × 14-in. main battery)
 Pennsylvania (Capt. C.F. Martin)
 6 destroyers
 4 Fletcher-class (5 × 5-in. main battery)
 Sigourney, Claxton, Aulick, Cony 
 2 Gleaves-class (4 × 5-in. main battery)
 Thorn, Welles

 Task Group 77.3 (Right Flank)
 Rear Admiral Russell S. Berkey in light cruiser Phoenix
 1 heavy cruiser
 1 County-class (8 × 8-in. main battery)
  Shropshire (Capt. C.A.G. Nichols, RN)
 2 light cruisers
 Both Brooklyn-class
 Phoenix (15 × 6-in. main battery) (Capt. J.H. Duncan)
 Boise (15 × 6-in. main battery) (Capt. J.S. Roberts)
 6 destroyers
 5 Fletcher-class (5 × 5-in. main battery)
 Hutchins, Bache, Beale, Daly, Killen
 1 Tribal-class (8 × 4.7-in. main battery)
  Arunta

 Picket Patrol
 Destroyer Squadron 54 (Capt. J.G. Coward)
 Destroyer Division 107
 2 Fletcher-class (5 × 5-in. main battery)
 Remey, Monssen
 Destroyer Division 108
 3 Fletcher-class (5 × 5-in. main battery)
 McDermut, McGowan, Melvin 

 Task Group 70.1 Motor Torpedo Boats
 18 motor torpedo boats (MTB)
 MTB Squadron 7: MTBs 127, 128, 129, 130, 131, 132, 134, 137
 MTB Squadron 12: MTBs 146, 150, 151, 152, 190, 191, 192, 194, 195, 196

25 Oct – Battle off Samar

Japanese Forces 

Centre Force ('Force A') (sortied from Brunei Bay 22 Oct)
 1st Section
 Vice Admiral Takeo Kurita
 Battleship Division 1 (Vice Adm. Matome Ugaki)
 2 battleships
 Yamato (9 × 18-in. main battery)
 Nagato (8 × 16-in. main battery)
 Cruiser Division 4 (Vice Adm. Kurita)
 1 heavy cruiser
 Chōkai  (10 × 8-in. main battery) 
 Cruiser Division 5 (Vice Adm. Shintaro Hashimoto)
 1 heavy cruiser
 Haguro (10 × 8-in. main battery)
 Destroyer Squadron 2 (Rear Adm. Mikio Hayakawa)
 1 light cruiser
 Noshiro (6 × 6.1-in. main battery) 
 9 destroyers
 8 Yugumo-class (6 × 5-in. main battery)
 Akishimo, Asashimo, Fujinami , Hamanami, Hayashimo , Kishinami, Okinami, Naganami
 1 Shimakaze (experimental destroyer type with 15 torpedo tubes)
Shimakaze (6 × 5-in. main battery)

 2nd Section
 Vice Admiral Yoshio Suzuki
 Battleship Division 3 (Vice Adm. Suzuki)
 2 battleships
 Kongō (8 × 14-in. main battery)
 Haruna (8 × 14-in. main battery)
 Cruiser Division 7 (Vice Adm. Kazutaka Shiraishi)
 4 heavy cruisers
 Kumano (10 × 8-in. main battery)
 Suzuya (10 × 8-in. main battery) 
 Chikuma (8 × 8-in. main battery) 
 Tone (8 × 8-in. main battery)
 Destroyer Squadron 10 (Rear Adm. Susumu Kimura)
 1 light cruiser
 Yahagi (6 × 6.1-in. main battery)
 6 destroyers
 5 Kagero-class (6 × 5-in. main battery)
 Hamakaze, Isokaze, Nowaki , Urakaze, Yukikaze
 1 Yugumo-class (6 × 5-in. main battery)
 Kiyoshimo

 Note: Battleship Musashi and heavy cruisers Atago, Takao, Myōkō, and Maya had been assigned to Center Force, but had been sunk or damaged by air and submarine attacks prior to the Battle off Samar.

American Forces 

Seventh Fleet
Vice Admiral Thomas C. Kinkaid in amphibious command ship Wasatch

 Task Force 77 (Central Philippines Attack Force)
 Vice Admiral Kinkaid

 Task Group 77.4 (Escort Carrier Group)
 Rear Admiral Thomas L. Sprague

 Task Unit 77.4.3 ("Taffy 3")
 Rear Admiral Clifton A.F. Sprague
 6 escort carriers
 Fanshaw Bay (Capt. D.P. Johnson)
 Composite Squadron 68 (Lt. Cmdr. R.S. Rogers)
 16 FM-2 Wildcat fighters
 12 TBM Avenger torpedo bombers
 St. Lo (Capt. F.J. McKenna) 
 Composite Squadron 65 (Lt. Cmdr. R.M. Jones)
 17 FM-2 Wildcat fighters
 12 TBM Avenger torpedo bombers
 White Plains (Capt. D.J. Sullivan)
 Composite Squadron 4 (Lt. E.R. Fickenscher)
 16 FM-2 Wildcat fighters
 12 TBM Avenger torpedo bombers
 Kalinin Bay (Capt. T.B. Williamson)
 Composite Squadron 3 (Lt. W.H. Keighley)
 16 FM-2 Wildcat fighters
   1 TBF, 11 TBM Avenger torpedo bombers
 Carrier Division 26 (Rear Adm. Ralph A. Ofstie)
 Kitkun Bay (Capt. J.P. Whitney)
 Composite Squadron 5 (Cmdr. R.L. Fowler)
 14 FM-2 Wildcat fighters
 12 TBM Avenger torpedo bombers	
 Gambier Bay (Capt. W.V.R. Vieweg) 
 Composite Squadron 10 (Lt. Cmdr. E.J. Huxtable)
 18 FM-2 Wildcat fighters
 12 TBM Avenger torpedo bombers
 Screen
 3 Fletcher-class destroyers (5 × 5-in. main battery)
 Hoel , Heermann, Johnston 
 4 John C. Butler-class destroyer escorts (2 × 5-in. main battery)
 Dennis, John C. Butler, Raymond, Samuel B. Roberts 

 Task Unit 77.4.2 ("Taffy 2")
 Rear Admiral Felix B. Stump
 6 escort carriers
 Natoma Bay (Capt. A.K. Morehouse)
 Composite Squadron 81 (Lt. Cmdr. R.C. Barnes)
 16 FM-2 Wildcat fighters
 12 TBM Avenger torpedo bombers
 Manila Bay (Capt. Fitzhugh Lee, III)
 Composite Squadron 80 (Lt. Cmdr. H.K. Stubbs)
 16 FM-2 Wildcat fighters
 12 TBM Avenger torpedo bombers	
 Carrier Division 27 (Rear Adm. William D. Sample)
 Marcus Island (Capt. C.F. Greber)
 Composite Squadron 21 (Lt. Cmdr T.O. Murray)
 12 FM-2 Wildcat fighters
 11 TBM Avenger torpedo bombers	
 Kadashan Bay (Capt. R.N. Hunter) 
 Composite Squadron 20 (Lt. Cmdr. J.R. Dale)
 15 FM-2 Wildcat fighters
 11 TBM Avenger torpedo bombers	
 Savo Island (Capt. C.E. Ekstrom)
 Composite Squadron 27 (Lt. Cmdr. P.W. Jackson)
 16 FM-2 Wildcat fighters
 12 TBM Avenger torpedo bombers	
 Ommaney Bay (Capt. H.L. Young)
 Composite Squadron 75 (Lt. Cmdr. A.W. Smith)
 16 FM-2 Wildcat fighters
 11 TBM Avenger torpedo bombers	
 Screen
 3 Fletcher-class destroyers (5 × 5-in. main battery)
 Haggard, Franks, Hailey
 5 John C. Butler-class destroyer escorts (2 × 5-in. main battery)
 Richard W. Suesens, Abercrombie, Oberrender, LeRay Wilson, Walter C. Wann

25 - 26 Oct – Battle off Cape Engaño

Japanese Forces 
Northern Force ('Main Body') (sortied from Japanese Home Islands 20 Oct)
Vice Admiral Jisaburo Ozawa

 Carrier Division 3 (Vice Adm. Ozawa)
 1 fleet carrier
 Zuikaku 
 3 light carriers
 Zuihō 
 Chitose 
 Chiyoda 
 Combined air group
 55 Mitsubishi A6M2 'Zeke' fighters
    58Yokosuka D4Y1 'Judy' dive bombers
 53 Nakajima B6N 'Jill' torpedo bombers
   4 Nakajima B5N2 'Kate' torpedo bombers 
 Carrier Division 4 (Rear Adm. Chiaki Matsuda)
 2 hybrid battleship carriers
 Ise (8 × 14-in. main battery)
 Hyūga (8 × 14-in. main battery)
 Combined air group for this operation: none
 Screen
 1 light cruiser
 Isuzu (7 × 5.5-in. main battery)
 8 destroyers
 4 Akizuki-class (6 × 3.9-in. main battery)
 Akizuki , Hatsuzuki , Shimotsuki, Wakatsuki
 4 Matsu-class (3 × 5-in. main battery)
 Kiri, Kuwa, Maki, Sugi
 2 light cruisers
 Tama (7 × 5.5-in. main battery) 
 Ōyodo (6 × 6.1-in. main battery)

American Forces

(according to )

Third Fleet 
Admiral William F. Halsey in battleship New Jersey
 Task Force 38 (Fast Carrier Force)
 Vice Admiral Marc A. Mitscher in fleet carrier Lexington

 Task Group 38.2 (Task Group Two)
 Rear Adm. Gerald F. Bogan
 1 fleet carrier
 USS Intrepid
 2 light carriers
 USS Cabot
 USS Independence
 2 fast battleships
 2 Iowa-class
 Iowa (9 x 16-in./50-cal. main battery)
 New Jersey (9 x 16-in./50-cal. main battery)
 3 light cruisers
 USS Biloxi
 USS Vincennes
 USS Miami
 16 destroyers

 Task Group 38.3 (Task Group Three)
 Rear Adm. Frederick C. Sherman
 2 fleet carriers
 USS Essex
 USS Lexington
 1 light carrier
 USS Langley
 2 fast battleships
 2 South Dakota class
 South Dakota (9 x 16-in./45-cal. main battery)
 Massachusetts (9 x 16-in./45-cal. main battery)
 3 light cruisers
 USS Santa Fe
 USS Mobile
 USS Reno
 10 destroyers

 Task Group 38.4 (Task Group Four)
 Rear Adm. Ralph E. Davison
 2 fleet carriers
 USS Franklin
 USS Enterprise
 2 light carriers
 USS San Jacinto
 USS Belleau Wood
 2 fast battleships
 1 North Carolina class
 Washington (9 x 16-in./45-cal. main battery)
 1 South Dakota class
 Alabama (9 x 16-in./45-cal. main battery)
 2 heavy cruisers
 USS New Orleans
 USS Wichita
 15 destroyers

 Task Force 34 (formed at 02:40 on 25 October, dissolved at 10:55 on 25 October)
 Vice Adm. Willis A. Lee
 6 fast battleships
 2 heavy cruisers
 New Orleans
 Wichita
 5 light cruisers
 Santa Fe
 Mobile
 Biloxi
 Vincennes
 Miami
 18 destroyers

Notes

References

Conflicts in 1944
1944 in the Philippines
Pacific Ocean theatre of World War II
Battle of Leyte Gulf
Naval aviation operations and battles
History of Leyte (province)
History of Samar (province)
Naval battles of World War II involving Australia
Naval battles of World War II involving Japan
Naval battles of World War II involving the United States
October 1944 events
Sibuyan Sea
World War II orders of battle